The Falaknuma - Lingampalli route (FL) is a rapid transit service of the Multi-Modal Transport System of Hyderabad, India. Spanning 17 stations, it runs between Falaknuma and  15 times a day.

Stations

External links
MMTS timings
 Hyderabad MMTS Train route map

Rail transport in Telangana
Hyderabad MMTS